Alfonso Téllez-Girón, 1st Count of Ureña, (in full), (c.1454–1469), was a Spanish nobleman.

Alfonso Téllez-Girón was born in Moral de Calatrava, the eldest natural son of Pedro Girón, 1st Lord of Osuna and of Inés de las Casas. He was legitimated by Papal bull on 22 April 1456, confirmed by King Henry IV of Castile on 30 April 1459.  The same king granted him the title of Count of Ureña (originally Urueña) on 25 May 1464. He married Blanca de Herrera, Lady of Pedraza de la Sierra, but had no issue. Alfonso Téllez-Girón died in El Espinar, Segovia, due to complications of a broken foot suffered during a ball game.

Sources

1454 births
1469 deaths
101
Alfonso
Alfonso